Paul Sharry (born 14 January 1989) is a Gaelic footballer who plays for the Westmeath county team.

Sharry played in his youth team active football and was contracted with Cherry Orchard. He joined Shamrock Rovers in 2007 and played with the club in the League of Ireland.

Playing career
The St Loman's GAA  clubman represented Westmeath GAA at senior level and played in the NFL division 3 final in 2011. Sharry represented the Ireland national Australian rules football team, that won the 2011 Australian Football International Cup and kicked three goals in the tournament. He was selected on the International Cup All Star Team.

References

1989 births
Living people
Gaelic footballers who switched code
Irish players of Australian rules football
Westmeath inter-county Gaelic footballers
St Loman's Gaelic footballers
Cherry Orchard F.C. players
Shamrock Rovers F.C. players
League of Ireland players
Association footballers not categorized by position
Republic of Ireland association footballers
Expatriate sportspeople in Australia